The Lives of Flemish, German, and Dutch painters refers to a compilation of artist biographies by Jean-Baptiste Descamps published in the mid 18th-century that were accompanied by illustrations by Charles Eisen. The list of illustrations follows and is in page order by volume. Most of the biographies were translated into French from earlier work by Karel van Mander and Arnold Houbraken. The illustrated portraits were mostly based on engravings by Jan Meyssens for Het Gulden Cabinet and by Arnold and Jacobus Houbraken for their Schouburgh, while the work examples engraved in the margins of the portraits were mostly based on engravings by Jacob Campo Weyerman.

Sources
 1753: La Vie des Peintres Flamands, Allemands et Hollandois, avec des portraits gravés en Taille-douce, une indication de leurs principaux Ouvrages, & des réflexions sur leurs différentes manieres, M J.B. Descamps, Peintre, Membre l'Académie Royale des Science, Belle-Lettres, & Art de Rouen, & Professeur de l'Ecole du Dessein de la méme Ville, Tome Premier, A Paris, chez Charles-Antoine Jombert, Libraire du Roi pour l'Artillerie & le Génie, rue Dauphine, à l'Image de Notre-Dame, M D CC LIII, Avec Approbation et Privilege du Roi
 1754: La Vie des Peintres Flamands, Allemands et Hollandois, avec des portraits gravés en Taille-douce, une indication de leurs principaux Ouvrages, & des réflexions sur leurs différentes manieres, M J.B. Descamps, Peintre, Membre l'Académie Royale des Science, Belle-Lettres, & Art de Rouen, & Professeur de l'Ecole du Dessein de la méme Ville, Tome Second, A Paris, chez Charles-Antoine Jombert, Libraire du Roi pour l'Artillerie & le Génie, rue Dauphine, à l'Image de Notre-Dame, M D CC LIV, Avec Approbation et Privilege du Roi
 1760: La Vie des Peintres Flamands, Allemands et Hollandois, avec des portraits gravés en Taille-douce, une indication de leurs principaux Ouvrages, & des réflexions sur leurs différentes manieres, Par M J.B. Descamps, Peintre, Membre l'Académie Impériale Franciscienne, de celle des Sciences, Belle-Lettres, & Art de Rouen, & Professeur de l'Ecole du Dessein de la méme Ville, Tome Troisieme, A Paris, chez Desaint & Saillant, rue de S. Jean de Beauvais, Pissot, Quai de Conty, Durand, rue de Foin, M D C LX, Avec Approbation et Privilege du Roi
 1764: La Vie des Peintres Flamands, Allemands et Hollandois, avec des portraits gravés en Taille-douce, une indication de leurs principaux Ouvrages, & des réflexions sur leurs différentes manieres, Par M J.B. Descamps, Peintre, Membre l'Académie Impériale Franciscienne, de celle des Sciences, Belle-Lettres, & Art de Rouen, & Professeur de l'Ecole du Dessein de la méme Ville, Tome Quatrieme, A Paris, chez Desaint & Saillant, rue de S. Jean de Beauvais, Pissot, Quai de Conty, Durand, le Neveu, rue S. Jacques, au coin de la rue du Platre, M D CC LXIV, Avec Approbation et Privilege du Roi

References

Art history books

1753 books
1754 books
1760 books
1764 books
Descamps